Staring at the Sun may refer to:

Music 
 Staring at the Sun (Level 42 album), 1988
 Staring at the Sun (Neil Zaza album), 2001
 "Staring at the Sun" (Anastacia song), 2014
 "Staring at the Sun" (Rooster song), 2005
 "Staring at the Sun" (TV on the Radio song), 2004
 "Staring at the Sun" (U2 song), 1997
 "Staring at the Sun", a song by Simple Kid
 "Staring at the Sun", a song by Mika from No Place in Heaven, 2015
 "Staring at the Sun", a song by The Offspring from Americana, 1998
 "Staring at the Sun", a song by Post Malone from Hollywood's Bleeding, 2019
 "Staring at the Sun", a song by Smile from Maquee, 1994
 "Staring at the Sun", a song by Ultra Vivid Scene from Joy 1967–1990
 "Staring at the Sun", a song by Wendy & Lisa from Eroica, 1990
 Staring at the Sun, a 2014 album by Anthony Head

Other media 
 Staring at the Sun (novel), a 1986 novel by Julian Barnes
 "Staring at the Sun" (Grey's Anatomy), an episode of the TV series Grey's Anatomy
 Staring at the Sun (film), a 2005 film starring Alec Newman
 Staring at the Sun: Overcoming the Terror of Death, a 2008 self-help book by Irvin Yalom
 Staring at the Sun, a film short, 2002
 Staring At The Sun, a radio program featuring experimental music on WVFS-Tallahassee, 89.7FM since 1990

See also 
 Staring into the Sun, a 1990 album by The Gufs
 "Staring to the Sun", a 2006 single by Scarling.
 Sungazing